Aalmaram is a 1969 Indian Malayalam-language film, directed by A. Vincent and produced by T. K. Pareekutty. The film stars Prem Nazir, Madhu, Sheela and Kaviyoor Ponnamma. The film had musical score by A. T. Ummer.

Cast

Prem Nazir as Soman
Madhu as Gopi
Sheela as Kusumam
Kaviyoor Ponnamma as Ammini Amma
Adoor Bhasi
P. J. Antony as Govinda Kurup
Sankaradi
Paul Vengola
Kottarakkara Sreedharan Nair as Kesava Pillai
Kuthiravattam Pappu
Kuttyedathi Vilasini
Paravoor Bharathan
K. V. Shanthi

Soundtrack
The music was composed by A. T. Ummer and the lyrics were written by P. Bhaskaran.

References

External links
 

1969 films
1960s Malayalam-language films
Films directed by A. Vincent